Saraiya Peerzada is a town and a Grampanchayat in Amethi District in the Indian state of Uttar Pradesh.

Demographics
 India census, Saraiya Peerzada had a population of 6,967. Males constitute 53% of the population and females 47%. Mahona has an average literacy rate of 35%, lower than the national average of 59.5%: male literacy is 42%, and female literacy is 27%. In Saraiya Peerzada, 19% of the population is under 6 years of age.

References

Cities and towns in Lucknow district